Inoa Baeau (born 21 September 1982) is a Papua New Guinean cricketer. A left-handed batsman and right-arm medium pace bowler, he has played for the Papua New Guinea national cricket team since 2005.

Career

Baeau's first taste of representative cricket came in 2004, when he represented a combined East Asia/Pacific team in the Australian national country cricket championships. He played for the same team in the 2005 and 2007 tournaments also.

He made his debut for Papua New Guinea at the repêchage tournament for the 2005 ICC Trophy. Papua New Guinea beat Fiji in the final, to qualify for the 2005 ICC Trophy in Ireland, where Baeau made his List A debut against Oman, winning the man of the match award after taking three wickets in the Oman innings.

He most recently played for Papua New Guinea at Division Three of the World Cricket League in Darwin, Australia.

References

1982 births
Living people
Papua New Guinean cricketers
People from the National Capital District (Papua New Guinea)